The Sonoma Mountain AVA  is an American Viticultural Area in Sonoma County, California, United States.  It is centered on the Sonoma Mountain landform in the Sonoma Mountains. The appellation includes the town of Glen Ellen, California and is nearly surrounded by the Sonoma Valley AVA. The area is known for the diverse micro-climates that occur on exposed hillsides and shaded drainages, and as such is home to production for a wide range of varieties including Cabernet Sauvignon, Chardonnay, Pinot noir, Sauvignon blanc, Semillon, and Zinfandel.

See also
 Sonoma County wine

References

American Viticultural Areas of the San Francisco Bay Area
Sonoma Mountains
Geography of Sonoma County, California
1985 establishments in California
American Viticultural Areas